Al Mosul University Stadium, is a multi-use stadium in Mosul, Iraq.  It is currently used mostly for football matches and serves as the home stadium of Mosul FC.  The stadium holds 20,000 people.

See also 
List of football stadiums in Iraq

References

Football venues in Iraq
Buildings and structures in Mosul